This is a list of Gundam manga and novels that are set in the Gundam anime metaseries.

Mobile Suit Gundam (Universal Century)

Manga 
10 MINUTES WAR U.C. 0079 
Advance of Zeta Mace of Judgment
Advance of Zeta Re-Boot: Gundam Inle - Black Rabbit Had a Dream
Advance of Zeta: The Flag of Titans
Advance of Zeta: The Traitor to Destiny
Apartment of Gundam
Char's Daily Life
Cho-Senshi Gundam Boy
Developers: Mobile Suit Gundam Before One Year War
Enhanced Human Tale: Another Z Gundam Story
Enhanced Human Tale: MAD WANG 1160
GREAT ADVENTURE OF GUNDAM
Go Ahead!! (Another War in UC 0044) 
Go! Go! Our V Gundam!!
Gun-Neta Championship
Gundam 0079 - 31.12. Decision
Gundam 0079 - Nightmare of Solomon 
Gundam Breaker
Gundam Legacy
Gundam Otaku Girl
Gundam Pilot Series of Biographies: The Brave Soldiers in the Sky
Gundam System of People
Gundam Sousei
Gundam True Odyssey
Gundam Unicorn Ace: Full Frontal's Counterattack
Gundam collection of short stories
Gundam: Char's Deleted Affair [C.D.A] ~ Portrait of Young Comet
Gunpla Koshien
Haman-San's Axis
Hit-Out
I Live Gundam UC
I see! Proverbs Gundam-san
IRON HEART
Iron Acguy
Iron Maiden
Jupiter (Zeus) in Operation Titan U.C. 0083 
Jupiter Mirage
MSV-R: The Return of Johnny Ridden
Magical Ensign Blaster Mari
Mobile Suit Acguy - MSM 04
Mobile Suit Collection Comic SECRET FORMULA
Mobile Suit Crossbone Gundam (Kidou Senshi Crossbone Gundam, 1994–1997) - by Yoshiyuki Tomino, Yuichi Hasegawa. The sequel to the movie, Gundam F91,
Mobile Suit Crossbone Gundam: Dust
Mobile Suit Crossbone Gundam: Ghost
Mobile Suit Crossbone Gundam: Skull Heart
Mobile Suit Crossbone Gundam: Steel 7
Mobile Suit Crossbone Gundam: Love & Piece
Mobile Suit Dog Gundam: Battles on Earth
Mobile Suit Fat Gundam
Mobile Suit Gundam (Kidou Senshi Gundam, 1979–1982) - by Yu Okazaki. The manga adaptation of the original series and movie.
Mobile Suit Gundam - Acguy: 2250 Miles Across North America
Mobile Suit Gundam - Anaheim Record
Mobile Suit Gundam - Day after Tomorrow: Kai Shiden's Memory
Mobile Suit Gundam - Vanishing Machine
Mobile Suit Gundam - Zeon MS Boys: The War of Independence
Mobile Suit Gundam 0079 (1992-1995) by Kazuhisa Kondo. A later adaptation of the original series.
Mobile Suit Gundam 0080 Visual Comic
Mobile Suit Gundam 0080: War in the Pocket (Kidou Senshi Gundam 0080: Pocket no Naka no Sensou, 1989) - by Shigeto Ikehara. The manga adaptation of the OVA series.
Mobile Suit Gundam 0083 Rebellion
Mobile Suit Gundam 0083: Hero of Stardust
Mobile Suit Gundam 0083: Stardust Memory (Kidou Senshi Gundam 0083: Stardust Memory, 1992) - by Mitsuru Kadoya. The manga adaptation of the OVA series.
Mobile Suit Gundam 0084: Psi-trailing
Mobile Suit Gundam 0099: Moon Crisis Side Story: Highlanders
Mobile Suit Gundam 4-koma Saizensen
Mobile Suit Gundam Aggressor
Mobile Suit Gundam Aishim 
Mobile Suit Gundam Alive 
Mobile Suit Gundam Almarya
Mobile Suit Gundam Battlefield Record U.C. 0081 - The Wrath of Varuna
Mobile Suit Gundam Card Builder
Mobile Suit Gundam Climax U.C.: The Bonds of the Bloodline
Mobile Suit Gundam Explosion
Mobile Suit Gundam F90
Mobile Suit Gundam F90: Fastest Formula
Mobile Suit Gundam F91 (Kidou Senshi Gundam F91, 1991) - by Daisuke Inoue. The manga adaptation of the original movie.
Mobile Suit Gundam Far East Japan
Mobile Suit Gundam Gaiden: Legend of the G
Mobile Suit Gundam Ground Zero Rise From The Ashes
Mobile Suit Gundam Katana
Mobile Suit Gundam MS IGLOO (Kidou Senshi Gundam MS IGLOO: Ichinen Sensou Hiroku, 2005 - ) - by MEIMU. The manga adaptation of CGI series.
Mobile Suit Gundam MS IGLOO 2: The Gravity Front
Mobile Suit Gundam MS IGLOO 603
Mobile Suit Gundam MS IGLOO Apocalypse 0079
Mobile Suit Gundam MSV Battle Chronicle Johnny Ridden
Mobile Suit Gundam MSV-R Legend of the Universal Century Heroes: Rainbow's Shin Matsunaga
Mobile Suit Gundam Narrative
Mobile Suit Gundam New Revival of Zeon
Mobile Suit Gundam Operation Troy
Mobile Suit Gundam Program Master
Mobile Suit Gundam REON
Mobile Suit Gundam Saigon 0081
Mobile Suit Gundam Side Story: Hidden Shadow G
Mobile Suit Gundam Side Story: Missing Link
Mobile Suit Gundam Side Story: Space, To the End of a Flash (Kidou Senshi Gundam: Uchu, Senkou no Hate ni, 2003) - by Tomohiro Chiba (Story), Masato Natsumoto (Illustration).
Mobile Suit Gundam Side Story: The Blue Destiny (Kidou Senshi Gundam Gaiden: The Blue Destiny, 1997) - by Mizuho Takayama. A manga retelling of the three Blue Destiny Sega Saturn games.
Mobile Suit Gundam Silhouette Formula 91 in UC 0123
Mobile Suit Gundam The MSV: The Mobile Suit Variations
Mobile Suit Gundam The Plot to Assassinate Gihren
Mobile Suit Gundam Thunderbolt
Mobile Suit Gundam Thunderbolt Side Story
Mobile Suit Gundam Thunderbolt Side Story: Sean The Sand Rat
Mobile Suit Gundam Twilight Axis
Mobile Suit Gundam U.C. 0094: Across The Sky
Mobile Suit Gundam U.C. 0096: Last Sun
Mobile Suit Gundam U.C. Hard graph: IRON MUSTANG
Mobile Suit Gundam UC MSV Kusabi
Mobile Suit Gundam UC: The Man Who Could Not Ride the Rainbow
Mobile Suit Gundam Unicorn - Bande Dessinee
Mobile Suit Gundam Unicorn - Bande Dessinee Episode: 0
Mobile Suit Gundam Unicorn 4-koma
Mobile Suit Gundam Unicorn Testament
Mobile Suit Gundam Unicorn The Truth of E.F.F.
Mobile Suit Gundam Unicorn: The Noble Shroud
Mobile Suit Gundam Walpurgis
Mobile Suit Gundam ZZ
Mobile Suit Gundam ZZ Side Story: Mirage of Zeon
Mobile Suit Gundam Zero Old Zakus
Mobile Suit Gundam Zeta
Mobile Suit Gundam in UC 0099: Moon Crisis
Mobile Suit Gundam the 08th MS Team U.C.0079 + α Tribute
Mobile Suit Gundam: Ecole du Ciel (Kidou Senshi Gundam Ecole du Ciel: Tenku no Gakko, 2002 - ) - by Haruhiko Mikimoto. French for School Of The Sky, it takes place during the early wars, where a young girl struggles to come to grips with her identity, as she enrolls in a Federation school, previously as a Zeon.
Mobile Suit Gundam – U.C. War Chronicle Memories of Char Aznable
Mobile Suit Gundam-san
Mobile Suit Gundam: After Jaburo
Mobile Suit Gundam: Char's Counterattack (Kidou Senshi Gundam: Gyakushuu no Char, 1987) - by Toshiya Murakami. The manga adaptation of the original movie.
Mobile Suit Gundam: Char's Counterattack - Beltorchika's Children
Mobile Suit Gundam: Char's Counterattack - Beyond the Time
Mobile Suit Gundam: Dining Table of G
Mobile Suit Gundam: Hunter of Black Clothes
Mobile Suit Gundam: Hybrid 4-Frame Comic Strip Great War Line
Mobile Suit Gundam: Ixtab, Goddess of the Fallen Soldiers
Mobile Suit Gundam: Lost War Chronicles
Mobile Suit Gundam: MS Generation
Mobile Suit Gundam: Outer Gundam
Mobile Suit Gundam: Principality of Zeon Military Preparatory School
Mobile Suit Gundam: Record of MS Wars
Mobile Suit Gundam: Record of MS Wars II
Mobile Suit Gundam: Super Dad Dozle - False War Story
Mobile Suit Gundam: The Legend of Heroes
Mobile Suit Gundam: The Light of A Baoa Qu
Mobile Suit Gundam: The Nameless Battlefield
Mobile Suit Gundam: The Origin (Kidou Senshi Gundam The Origin, 2002 - 2011) - by Yoshikazu Yasuhiko. The second, broader manga adaptation, which follows the same storyline, but with different details
Mobile Suit Gundam: The Origin - Amuro 0082
Mobile Suit Gundam: The Origin - Casval 0057
Mobile Suit Gundam: The Origin - On the Eve
Mobile Suit Gundam: The Origin Artesia 0083
Mobile Suit Gundam: The Origin MSD: Cucuruz Doan's Island
Mobile Suit Gundam: The Revival of Zeon
Mobile Suit Gundam: We're Federation Hooligans!!
Mobile Suit Gundam: time capsule from 1-chome
Mobile Suit Moon Gundam
Mobile Suit O Gundam: Newtype's Light
Mobile Suit Rhapsody: The Zadis Family Episode 
Mobile Suit V Gundam Project Exodus
Mobile Suit Variations: Ace Pilot Story
Mobile Suit Victory Gundam (Kidou Senshi V Gundam, 1993–1994) - by Toshiya Iwamura. The manga adaptation of the original series.
Mobile Suit Victory Gundam Outside Story 
Mobile Suit Vor!!
Mobile Suit Vs. Giant God of Legend: Gigantis' Counterattack
Mobile Suit Z Gundam II Lovers
Mobile Suit Z Gundam III Love is the Pulse of the Stars
Mobile Suit Gundam ZZ (Kidou Senshi Gundam ZZ, 1986–1987) - by Toshiya Murakami. The manga adaptation of the original series.
Mobile Suit ZZ Gundam The Senility of Char
Mobile Suit Zeta Gundam (Kidou Senshi Z Gundam, 1985–1986) - by Kazuhisa Kondo. The manga adaptation of the original series.
Mobile Suit Zeta Gundam 1/2 UC 0087: Another Story
Mobile Suit Zeta Gundam Define
Mobile Suit Zeta Gundam Heir to the Stars
Mobile Suit Zeta Gundam Sayonara
Mobile Suit Zeta Gundam: Day After Tomorrow - From Kai Shiden's Report
Moon Rain
My First Triumph: A Memory of Emma Sheen
Newtype War Chronicles
Nightmare of Solomon
One Day: Haman's Deleted Affair 
Operation Buran U.C. 0079
Ore wa Nama Gundam
PILLOW TALK GUNDAM NIGHT=HAWKS!
Plamo Boy and Pretty Girl - Mizuo and Jena's One Year War -
Sarah Zabiarov - The White Knight of the Round Table
Shuuichi Ikeda's Three Times Faster!! There goes Char! Journal of Investigations of the Figures behind Gundam
Side Operation of the Zeon U.C. 0092
Side Story of Gundam Zeta
South Indian Ocean waves U.C. 0093
Stampede: The Story of Professor Minovsky
The Dog of War U.C. 0092
Tony Takezaki no Saku Saku Daisaku Sen
Tony Takezaki presents GUNDAM manga
Double-Fake: Under the Gundam (Double-Fake: Under the Gundam, 1989) - by Yuji Ushida. A side-story that focuses on a decoy operation, launched by Char, in U.C.0090.

Novels 
Advance of Zeta The Traitor to Destiny Extra Compilation: Mace of Judgment
Advance of Zeta: Blue Wings of the AEUG
Advance of Zeta: The Traitor to Destiny
Anaheim Laboratory Log
Char Aznable Biography - Locus of Red Comet
For the Barrel
G-Saviour
Gaia Gear (1987–1989) - by Yoshiyuki Tomino. A non-canonical side story, set in the U.C.0200s, where an anti-Federation group creates a clone of Char to battle Manhunter.
Gundam Anaheim Journal U.C. 0083 - 0099
Gundam MS Graphica
Gundam Novels – The soldier which becomes the spark
Gundam Sentinel (Gundam Sentinel: Alice no Zange, 1988–1990) - by Masaya Takahashi.
Mobile Suit Gundam ZZ Side Story: Thoughts of a Dying Atheist
Gundam Wars Series 
Look for Avenir
Mobile Suit Gundam
Mobile Suit Gundam - Burning Pursuit
Mobile Suit Gundam 0080 War in the Pocket Chris Dreams
Mobile Suit Gundam 0080: War in the Pocket
Mobile Suit Gundam 0083: Stardust Memory
Mobile Suit Gundam 0087: Jerid Sortie Order
Mobile Suit Gundam Char's Return
Mobile Suit Gundam F91 Crossbone Vanguard
Mobile Suit Gundam Last Red Comet
Mobile Suit Gundam MSV-R The Troublemakers
Mobile Suit Gundam Narrative
Mobile Suit Gundam Secret Weapons Phantom Bullets
Mobile Suit Gundam Side Story: At the Site of the Fallen Colony
Mobile Suit Gundam Twilight Axis
Mobile Suit Gundam U.C. Hard Graph: Earth Federation Forces
Mobile Suit Gundam UC: Phoenix Hunting
Mobile Suit Gundam UC: The War After the War
Mobile Suit Gundam Unicorn (2001-2009) - by Haruyoshi Fukui. The story is set in U.C. 0096 and depicts the journey of Banagher Links and his RX-0 Gundam Unicorn.
Mobile Suit Gundam ZZ
Mobile Suit Gundam: Awakening, Escalation, Confrontation (Kidou Senshi Gundam, 1979–1981) - by Yoshiyuki Tomino. The novels follow an alternative plot line of Mobile Suit Gundam. 
Mobile Suit Gundam: Char's Counterattack - Beltorchika's Children
Mobile Suit Gundam: Char's Counterattack - High Streamer
Mobile Suit Gundam: Hathaway's Flash (Kidou Senshi Gundam: Senkou no Hathaway, 1989) - by Yoshiyuki Tomino. The story of Hathaway, Bright Noah's son, 
Mobile Suit Gundam: Secret Rendezvous
Mobile Suit Gundam: The 08th MS Team (Kidou Senshi Gundam: Dai 08 MS Shoutai, 1999) - by Ichiro Okochi. The novel adaptation of the original series.
Mobile Suit Gundam: The Blazing Shadow
Mobile Suit Gundam: Zeonic Front 0079
Mobile Suit Victory Gundam
Mobile Suit War Chronicles Side Story - Born to be Wild Again: Reborn Warrior
Mobile Suit Zeta Gundam
Mobile Suit Zeta Gundam: Four Story - And to a soldier...
Original Gundam Story: Inner Gundam Space of Ageta 
THE FIRST STEP
The 08th MS Team Side Story: Trivial Operation
The Star of Zeon - Mobile Suit in Action
Top Gundam
Tyrant Sword of Neofalia

Mobile Fighter G Gundam (Future Century)

Manga 
 Authored by Kōichi Tokita, serialized in Kodansha's Comic BonBon, 1994–1995. The manga adaptation of the original series.
Fusion Clashes: Gundam Battle-Rave
Go For it Domon! Gundam Party
Mobile Fighter G Gundam Side Story: Flying Dragon Legend 
Mobile Fighter G Gundam Side Story: Tower Of Death 
Mobile Fighter G Gundam The Next Generation 
Mobile Fighter G Gundam: 7th Fight 
Mobile Fighter G Gundam: Edge Of Gunsmoke 
Mobile Fighter G Gundam: Revenge of J Gundam 
Super-Class! Mobile Fighter G Gundam 
Super-Class! Mobile Fighter G Gundam: Erupting Neo Hong Kong! 
Super-Class! Mobile Fighter G Gundam: Shinjuku/Undefeated of the East! 
Super-Class! Mobile Fighter G Gundam: The Final Battle

Mobile Suit Gundam Wing (After Colony)

Manga 
Mobile Suit Gundam Wing: Episode Zero (Shin Kidou Senki Gundam W: Episode Zero, 1997) - by Katsuyuki Sumisawa (Story), Akira Kanbe (Illustration). Set before the original TV series, it tells the stories of the children that will eventually become the five Gundam pilots.
New Mobile Report Gundam Wing (Shin Kidou Senki Gundam W, 1995–1996) - by Kōichi Tokita. The manga adaptation of the original series.
New Mobile Report Gundam Wing Dual Story: G-Unit (Shin Kidou Senki Gundam W Dual Story: G-UNIT, 1997) - by Kōichi Tokita.
New Mobile Report Gundam Wing: Endless Waltz (Shin Kidou Senki Gundam W: Endless Waltz, 1998) - by Kōichi Tokita. The manga adaptation of the original OVA and movie.
New Mobile Report Gundam Wing: Ground Zero
New Mobile Report Gundam Wing: Blind Target
New Mobile Report Gundam Wing: Battlefield of Pacifists
New Mobile Report Gundam Wing Sidestory: Tiel's Impulse 
New Mobile Report Gundam Wing Endless Waltz: Glory of the Losers
New Mobile Report Gundam Wing Dual Story: G-Unit Operation Galiarest (Shin Kidou Senki Gundam W Dual Story: G-UNIT Operation Galiarest, 2019) - by Kōichi Tokita.

Novel 
New Mobile Report Gundam Wing: Frozen Teardrop (Shin Kidou Senki Gundam W: Frozen Teardrop, 2010-?) - by Katsuyuki Sumizawa. A novel featuring new and old characters in a new timeline.
New Mobile Report Gundam Wing Side Story: A Scythe In My Right Hand, You In My Left
New Mobile Report Gundam Wing Perfect Album Bom-Bom Comic
Gundam Wing Technical Manual
Encyclopedia of Gundam Wing

After War Gundam X (After War)

Manga 

After War Gundam X (Kidou Shin Seiki Gundam X, 1996–1997) - manga adaptation of the series; by Koichi Tokita
After War Gundam X NEXT PROLOGUE 
After War Gundam X: Newtype Warrior Jamil Neate
After War Gundam X: Under the Moonlight (Kidou Shin Seiki Gundam X: Under The Moonlight, 2004 - ) - manga by Yutaka Akatsu (Story), Chitose Oshima (Illustration)

Turn A Gundam (Correct Century (Seireki))

Manga 
∀ Gundam (1999–2000) - manga adaptation of the series for children; by Koichi Tokita
∀ Gundam: Wind of the Moon

Novels 
∀ Gundam: Episodes

Mobile Suit Gundam SEED (Cosmic Era)

Manga 

C.E.70
Mobile Suit Gundam SEED (Kidou Senshi Gundam SEED, 2002–2004) - manga adaptation of the series for teens; by Masatsugu Iwase
Mobile Suit Gundam SEED Astray (Kidou Senshi Gundam SEED Astray, 2002–2004) - set in the same time frame as the first series, tells the story of three abandoned Orb prototypes called Gundam Astray; manga by Tomohiro Chiba (Story), Koichi Tokita (Illustration)
Mobile Suit Gundam SEED Destiny (Kidou Senshi Gundam SEED Destiny, 2004–2005) - manga adaptation of the series for teens; by Masatsugu Iwase
Mobile Suit Gundam SEED Destiny: The Edge (Kidou Senshi Gundam SEED: The Edge, 2005 - ) - the events of the series from Athrun Zala's point of view; by Chimaki Kuori
Mobile Suit Gundam SEED Destiny Astray (Kidou Senshi Gundam SEED Destiny Astray, 2004–2006) - a young photojournalist uses the next generation Astray to show the truth to the world; by Tomohiro Chiba (Story), Koichi Tokita (Illustration)
Mobile Suit Gundam SEED C.E. 73 Δ Astray (Kidou Senshi Gundam SEED C.E. 73 Δ Astray, 2006–2007) - follows the story of a team dispatched from Mars to Earth; by Tomohiro Chiba (Story), Koichi Tokita (Illustration)
Mobile Suit Gundam SEED Astray MSV
Mobile Suit Gundam SEED Astray R
Mobile Suit Gundam SEED C.E. 73: STARGAZER
Mobile Suit Gundam SEED Frame Astrays
Mobile Suit Gundam SEED MSV: The Blooming of Housenka on the Battlefield
Mobile Suit Gundam SEED Re:
Mobile Suit Gundam SEED X Astray
Mobile Suit Gundam SEED featuring SUIT CD
Mobile Suit Gundam SEED ASTRAY Princess of the Sky

Novels 
Mobile Suit Gundam SEED (Kidou Senshi Gundam SEED, 2003–2004) - novels adaptation of the series; by Riu Goto
Mobile Suit Gundam SEED Destiny
Mobile Suit Gundam SEED Astray B
Mobile Suit Gundam SEED C.E. 73 STARGAZER: Phantom Pain Report
Mobile Suit Gundam SEED Destiny Astray
Mobile Suit Gundam SEED Destiny Astray B
Mobile Suit Gundam SEED Destiny Astray R
Mobile Suit Gundam SEED VS Astray

Mobile Suit Gundam 00 (Anno Domini)

Manga 
Gundam 00 - Crossword Puzzle Comic Characters Black! 
Mobile Suit Gundam 00 (Kidou Senshi Gundam 00, 2007 - )
Mobile Suit Gundam 00 -A wakening of the Trailblazer-
Mobile Suit Gundam 00 2nd Season
Mobile Suit Gundam 00 Dear Meisters
Mobile Suit Gundam 00: Blue Memories
Mobile Suit Gundam 00: Bonds
Mobile Suit Gundam 00: In Those Days
Mobile Suit Gundam 00F
Mobile Suit Gundam 00I
Mobile Suit Gundam 00I 2314

Novels 
Mobile Suit Gundam 00
Mobile Suit Gundam 00 -A wakening of the Trailblazer-
Mobile Suit Gundam 00 Second Season
Mobile Suit Gundam 00N
Mobile Suit Gundam 00P

Mobile Suit Gundam AGE (Advanced Generation)

Manga 
Mobile Suit Gundam AGE Climax Hero
Mobile Suit Gundam AGE Final Evolution
Mobile Suit Gundam AGE First Evolution
Mobile Suit Gundam AGE Second Evolution
Mobile Suit Gundam AGE: Memories of Sid
Mobile Suit Gundam AGE: Story of the Beginning
Mobile Suit Gundam AGE: Treasure Star

Novels 
Mobile Suit Gundam AGE
Mobile Suit Gundam AGE ⇀EXA-LOG↽

Gundam Reconguista in G (Regild Century)

Manga 

Gundam Reconguista in G

Mobile Suit Gundam: Iron-Blooded Orphans (Post Disaster)

Manga
Mobile Suit Gundam: Iron-Blooded Orphans (Kido Senshi Gundam: Tekketsu no Orphans, 2015 - 2022 )
Mobile Suit Gundam: Iron-Blooded Orphans: Steel Moon

Gunpla Builders Beginning G

Manga 
Model Suit Gunpla Builders A
Model Suit Gunpla Builders Beginning D

Novels 
Model Suit Gunpla Builders Beginning J

Gundam Build Fighters

Manga 
Gundam Build Fighters Amazing
Gundam Build Fighters Amazing Ready
Gundam Build Fighters Amazing Try
Gundam Build Fighters Plamo Diver: Kit & Built

Novels 
Gundam Build Fighters
Gundam Build Fighters Document
Gundam Build Fighters Honoo
Gundam Build Fighters Honoo Try

Video game originated works

Other
Mobile Suit Gundam-san (2001–present) - A 4-koma style parody of the original Mobile Suit Gundam; by Hideki Ohwada. Being adopted into an anime.
Mobile Suit Gundam Alive (2006-2007) - A Gundam story set in the modern day; by Mizuho Takayama
Mobile War History Gundam Burai (2019-present) - An original Gundam story that takes place in its own continuity; set in an alternate history Japan during a fictional Tenpō (天法, lit. heaven law) Era where giant mechs, known as Tetsuki (lit. iron machine), were used to fight wars until a shogunate by the fictional Tokugō house put a stop to the war and established a martial arts contest, the Sankin Kōtai (lit. attendance steel match), where the winners of the contest would see their wishes granted.
Despair Memory Gundam Sequel (2022-present) - An original work set after a great war which cost humanity half of its population, after which the Gundams that helped save the Earth were destroyed and the newtypes who piloted them were rounded up and slaughtered. Years later, in a far off space colony, the assassin Bloody Kaoris is a "Neos", a person with special powers.

Series about Gundam modeling simulation battles
These series are about characters building their own Gundam models, or Gunpla, and having them battle in a simulation arena.
 Plamo-kyo Shiro (プラモ狂四郎, Puramokyōshirō)(1982–1986)
 A spinoff series mainly based on the models of the first Gundam series along with its Mobile Suit Variation series. It was the first Gundam series about battling with Gunpla, rather than actual Mobile Suits. The Gundams in the series are both modifications of existing models and brand-new ones, like the PF-78-1 Perfect Gundam, Red Warrior, and Musha Gundam, which were endorsed by Bandai and later released as official models and figures, and also used as units featured in various games. The series featured the idea, later used in Mobile Fighter G Gundam, of the pilot's emotions being reflected by the movements of the  Gundam unit. Various series using the same basic idea were published, including the sequels:
 New Plamo-kyo Shiro
 Super Warrior Gundam yaro
 Plamo-kin Taro
 Plamo-Wars (1994–1998)
 Gunpla Musashi

References

Gundam lists
Gundam
Gundam